Pierce Brown (Born January 28, 1988) is an American science fiction author who writes the Red Rising series, consisting of Red Rising (2014), Golden Son (2015), Morning Star (2016), Iron Gold (2018) and Dark Age (2019).

Personal life 
Pierce Brown grew up in seven different states. His mother, Colleen Brown, was the President and CEO of Fisher Communications and the Chairman of American Apparel's Board of Directors. His father, Guy Brown, is a former local banker.

Brown graduated from Pepperdine University, where he majored in political science and economics. After graduation, he worked a variety of jobs in politics and startup tech companies. Brown was working for the NBC Page Program in Burbank, California and living in his former political science professor's garage when he sold Red Rising in 2012.

Career 

Brown wrote six novels and faced rejection from over 120 agents before selling Red Rising. He wrote the novel in two months above his parents' garage in Seattle, Washington.

Red Rising, published in 2014, received widespread positive reviews, and hit #20 on The New York Times Best Seller list. The 2015 sequel, Golden Son, hit #6 on the same list and was equally praised by critics. In 2016, Morning Star reached #1 on the New York Times Best Seller list in Adult Hardcover, Digital Book and cumulative. It also reached #1 on the USA Today Best-Selling Books list.

In February 2014, shortly after the release of Red Rising, Universal Pictures acquired the rights for a film adaptation in a 7-figure auction. Marc Forster is set to direct, with Brown writing the screenplay. Brown told Entertainment Weekly that after completing the original trilogy, "I took a meager little break, mostly to stretch my screenwriting muscles." As of February 2016, the film was still in development, with Brown having written the first two drafts. He said in March 2016, "I have written the first two drafts of the film and now we're on the third. Hopefully it will be greenlit this year. The vision from the film makers is Lawrence of Arabia in space', which is terribly exciting for me as it's my favorite film." The rights eventually reverted to Brown, and in January 2018 he said he was developing Red Rising as a television series. Brown confirmed in October 2018 that the project had a director and a showrunner, and added that the film rights had also been resold to an unspecified studio.

Brown announced a sequel trilogy in February 2016, to begin with the novel Iron Gold in August 2017. A prequel comic book series, Red Rising: Sons of Ares, debuted in May 2017.

Brown said of his writing:

The author has said that his writing has been "hugely" influenced by his readers' feedback, explaining:

Brown also noted the popularity of his novels among the LGBT community, saying "It's amazing that they have found a home in these books ... All these lost souls in my books have connected with people and I find it incredibly moving."

Reception
Mac Snetiker of Entertainment Weekly wrote, "Brown has packed his pages with an astonishing amount of cinematic action and twists", and Jason Sheehan of NPR agreed that "Brown writes layered, flawed characters ... but plot is his most breathtaking strength ... Every action seems to flow into the next." Kirkus Reviews called the third installment, Morning Star, "multilayered and seething with characters who exist in a shadow world between history and myth, much as in Frank Herbert’s Dune ... an ambitious and satisfying conclusion to a monumental saga".

Brown is the recipient of the Goodreads 2014 Best New Novelist Award, as well as the Goodreads Best Science Fiction Novel Award in 2015 for Golden Son and in 2016 for Morning Star.

Bibliography

Novels
 Red Rising (2014)
 Golden Son (2015)
 Morning Star (2016)
 Iron Gold (2018)
 Dark Age (2019)
 Light Bringer (2023)
 Red God (TBD)

Comic books
 Red Rising: Sons of Ares (2017)
 Red Rising: Sons of Ares – Volume 2: Wrath (2020)
 Red Rising: Sons of Ares – Volume 3: Forbidden Song (2023)

Short stories
 Star Wars: From a Certain Point of View – "Desert Son" (2017)

References

External links

 
 

1988 births
21st-century American novelists
21st-century American male writers
American male novelists
American science fiction writers
Living people
People from Denver